The 1999 South Carolina Gamecocks football team represented the University of South Carolina in the Southeastern Conference (SEC) during the 1999 NCAA Division I-A football season.  The Gamecocks were led by Lou Holtz in his first season as head coach and played their home games in Williams-Brice Stadium in Columbia, South Carolina.

This was the Gamecocks' first winless season in over a hundred years.

Schedule

Roster

Coaching staff
Lou Holtz – Head Coach
Skip Holtz – Offensive Coordinator/Quarterbacks
Charlie Strong – Defensive Coordinator/Defensive Backs
 – Assistant Head Coach/Offensive Line
Chris Cosh – Linebackers
 – Running Backs
 – Tight Ends
Jon Michael Fabris – Defensive Line
Todd Fitch – Wide Receivers
 – Outside Linebackers
 – Defensive Video Graduate Assistant
 – Defensive Graduate Assistant
 – Offensive Graduate Assistant
 – Offensive Video Graduate Assistant

References

South Carolina
South Carolina Gamecocks football seasons
College football winless seasons
South Carolina Gamecocks football